There are a number of listed buildings in Greater Manchester. The term "listed building", in the United Kingdom, refers to a building or structure designated as being of special architectural, historical, or cultural significance. Details of all the listed buildings are contained in the National Heritage List for England. They are categorised in three grades: Grade I consists of buildings of outstanding architectural or historical interest, Grade II* includes significant buildings of more than local interest and Grade II consists of buildings of special architectural or historical interest. Buildings in England are listed by the Secretary of State for Culture, Media and Sport on recommendations provided by English Heritage, which also determines the grading.

Some listed buildings are looked after by the National Trust or English Heritage while others are in private ownership or administered by trusts.

Listed buildings by grade
Grade I listed buildings in Greater Manchester
Grade II* listed buildings in Greater Manchester

Listed buildings by district or unitary authority
Within each local government district, buildings are listed by civil parish or unparished area.

Bolton

 Listed buildings in Blackrod
 Listed buildings in Bolton
 Listed buildings in Farnworth
 Listed buildings in Horwich
 Listed buildings in Kearsley
 Listed buildings in Little Lever
 Listed buildings in South Turton
 Listed buildings in Westhoughton

Bury

 Listed buildings in Bury
 Listed buildings in Prestwich
 Listed buildings in Radcliffe, Greater Manchester
 Listed buildings in Ramsbottom
 Listed buildings in Tottington, Greater Manchester
 Listed buildings in Whitefield, Greater Manchester

Manchester

Manchester Grade II (central)
Listed buildings in Manchester-M1
Listed buildings in Manchester-M2
Listed buildings in Manchester-M3
Listed buildings in Manchester-M4
Listed buildings in Manchester-M8
Listed buildings in Manchester-M9
Listed buildings in Manchester-M11
Listed buildings in Manchester-M12
Listed buildings in Manchester-M13
Listed buildings in Manchester-M14
Listed buildings in Manchester-M15
Listed buildings in Manchester-M16
Listed buildings in Manchester-M18
Listed buildings in Manchester-M19
Listed buildings in Manchester-M20
Listed buildings in Manchester-M21
Listed buildings in Manchester-M22
Listed buildings in Manchester-M23
Listed buildings in Manchester-M25 (Manchester district)
Listed buildings in Manchester-M40
Listed buildings in Manchester-M60
Listed buildings in Ringway, Manchester

Oldham

 Listed buildings in Chadderton
 Listed buildings in Failsworth
 Listed buildings in Lees, Greater Manchester
 Listed buildings in Oldham
 Listed buildings in Royton
 Listed buildings in Saddleworth
 Listed buildings in Shaw and Crompton

Rochdale

 Listed buildings in Heywood, Greater Manchester
 Listed buildings in Littleborough, Greater Manchester
 Listed buildings in Middleton, Greater Manchester
 Listed buildings in Milnrow
 Listed buildings in Rochdale
 Listed buildings in Wardle, Greater Manchester

Salford

 Listed buildings in Eccles, Greater Manchester
 Listed buildings in Irlam
 Listed buildings in Salford, Greater Manchester
 Listed buildings in Swinton and Pendlebury 
 Listed buildings in Worsley

Stockport

Listed buildings in Bredbury and Romiley
Listed buildings in Cheadle and Gatley
Listed buildings in Hazel Grove and Bramhall
Listed buildings in Marple, Greater Manchester
Listed buildings in Stockport

Tameside

Listed buildings in Ashton-under-Lyne
Listed buildings in Audenshaw
Listed buildings in Denton, Greater Manchester
Listed buildings in Droylsden
Listed buildings in Dukinfield
Listed buildings in Hyde, Greater Manchester
Listed buildings in Longdendale
Listed buildings in Mossley
Listed buildings in Stalybridge

Trafford

Listed buildings in Altrincham
Listed buildings in Bowdon, Greater Manchester
Listed buildings in Carrington, Greater Manchester
Listed buildings in Dunham Massey
Listed buildings in Hale, Greater Manchester
Listed buildings in Partington
Listed buildings in Sale, Greater Manchester
Listed buildings in Stretford
Listed buildings in Urmston
Listed buildings in Warburton, Greater Manchester

Wigan

Listed buildings in Abram, Greater Manchester
Listed buildings in Ashton-in-Makerfield
Listed buildings in Aspull
Listed buildings in Astley, Greater Manchester
Listed buildings in Atherton, Greater Manchester
Listed buildings in Billinge and Winstanley
Listed buildings in Golborne
Listed buildings in Haigh, Greater Manchester
Listed buildings in Hindley, Greater Manchester
Listed buildings in Ince-in-Makerfield
Listed buildings in Leigh, Greater Manchester
Listed buildings in Orrell, Greater Manchester
Listed buildings in Shevington
Listed buildings in Standish, Greater Manchester
Listed buildings in Tyldesley
Listed buildings in Wigan
Listed buildings in Worthington, Greater Manchester

Churches
Grade I listed churches in Greater Manchester

References

 
Greater Manchester